Palermo Union School District (PUSD) is a public school district based in Butte County, California, United States.

References

External links
 

School districts in Butte County, California